Richard Esberry Morgan (July 25, 1920 – December 2, 1989) was an American film and television actor. He appeared in over 70 films and television programs, and was known for playing the role of Buck Henderson in the 1957 film The Tin Star.

He also appeared as a cold hearted and oft drunk “Deputy Gamer” in a 1962 episode of Gunsmoke entitled “The Gallows” (S7E22).

Partial filmography 

The Girls of Pleasure Island (1953) - Captain McKendry (uncredited)
Pony Express (1953) - Red Barrett
The Vanquished (1953) - Lieutenant Adams (uncredited)
Houdini (1953) - Miner (uncredited)
Arrowhead (1953) - Lieutenant Kirk
Flight to Tangier (1953) - Lieutenant Bill Luzon
Forever Female (1953) - Stage Manager
Alaska Seas (1954) - Tom Erickson
White Christmas (1954) - Joe the Adjutant Captain (uncredited)
The Bridges at Toko-Ri (1954) - Lieutenant Olds
Strategic Air Command (1955) - Flight Instructor Pilot
Conquest of Space (1955) - Crewman (uncredited)
The Seven Little Foys (1955) - Stage Manager
Artists and Models (1955) - Secret Service Agent Rogers
That Certain Feeling (1956) - Cab Driver (uncredited)
The Leather Saint (1956) - Tom Kelly
The Proud and Profane (1956) - Major
The Vagabond King (1956) - Sergeant (uncredited)
Spring Reunion (1956) - Nick
Beau James (1957) - Dick Jackson
Trooper Hook (1957) - Trooper Ryan
The Tin Star (1957) - Buck Henderson
Ride Out for Revenge (1957) - Garvin
Ride a Violent Mile (1957) - Sam
Kiss Them for Me (1957) - War Correspondent (uncredited)
Cattle Empire (1958) - Garth
The Space Children (1958) - Lieutenant Colonel Alan Manley
Desert Hell (1958) - Pvt. Hoffstetter
The Trap (1959) - Len Karger
Don't Give Up the Ship (1959) - Cmdr. Cross
The Jayhawkers! (1959) - Townsman
Heller in Pink Tights (1960) - Man at Desk (uncredited)
The Proper Time (1962) - Dr. Polery

References

External links 

Rotten Tomatoes profile

1920 births
1989 deaths
People from San Francisco
Male actors from San Francisco
American male film actors
American male television actors
20th-century American male actors
Western (genre) television actors
Male Western (genre) film actors